Abdur Razzaq (– 28 November 1999) was a Bangladeshi scholar, academic, public intellectual and one of the first National Professors of Bangladesh.

Early life and education
Razzaq was born in 1914 in the Paragram village of Nawabganj Upazila  of Dhaka District. His father, Abdul Ali, was a police officer. After his matriculation from the Government Muslim High School, Dhaka and intermediate exam from Dhaka College, he was admitted to the department of political economy at the University of Dhaka in 1931. In 1936, he completed his masters and then joined as a lecturer in the same department. When the department of political economy was bisected, he chose to join the department of political science. After the second world war, he went to London to study under Harold Laski at London School of Economics. He returned home without any formal degree after Laski had died in 1950 and carried on teaching in the department of political science at the University of Dhaka until 1975. He also taught in the departments of economics and international relations.

Career

Razzaq's political ideas influenced anti-Ayub-government movements during the 1960s; to get rid of his influence, the Ayub regime tried to "dismiss him from his teaching position at the University of Dhaka on the allegation that he was not mindful of his duties as a teacher, but which the government failed to establish in the court". During the Bangladesh Liberation War, he witnessed the March 1971 Dhaka University massacre. The Pakistanis came to arrest him at his home, but alerted by their kicking at his door, he escaped out the back. The Yahya Khan-government sentenced him in absentia to a fourteen-year rigorous imprisonment, accusing him of treasonable acts.

Though Razzaq, apart from some essays and lectures, has no published works, many intellectuals have admitted his influence on their published works. Ahmed Sofa wrote his book, Jaddapi Amar Guru (Eventhough My Teacher), on Razzaq's life. Sardar Fazlul Karim published a book, Dhaka Bisshobiddalay O Purbabangya Samaj,  based on his interviews of Razzaq. Salimullah Khan wrote a book on his lecture ‘’Bangladesh: State of the Nation’’. Muntassir Mamoon, Humayun Azad and others reminisced about him. It is claimed that he had as his students more than 70 members of parliament, among whom Sheikh Mujibur Rahman is the most notable.

Honors
To acknowledge his unique status as a teacher, the Government of Bangladesh honored him with the distinction of National Professor in 1975. In 1973, the University of Delhi awarded him an honorary D.Litt. degree.

References

1910s births
1999 deaths
Dhaka College alumni
University of Dhaka alumni
Academic staff of the University of Dhaka
National Professors of Bangladesh
Honorary Fellows of Bangla Academy
20th-century Bengalis
People from Dhaka District